Roberto R. Alonzo (born December 25, 1956) is a former Democratic member of the Texas House of Representatives, representing the 104th District from 1993 to 2019. Alonzo was defeated in the Democratic primary on March 6, 2018 by Jessica González.

Education
Alonzo is an alumnus of The University of Texas at Austin and the Thurgood Marshall School of Law at Texas Southern University.

Political career
In 2017, during the 85th Texas Legislature, Representative Alonzo helped lead the fight against Senate Bill 4 by referencing the Chicano bogeyman known as "el cucuy". Rep. Alonzo's use of "el cucuy" attempted to communicate to his Republican colleagues the negative psychological effects legislation such as SB4 would have on immigrant communities.

Representative Alonzo drew the ire of some Dallas residents over a housing dispute.

Alonzo ran for Texas Railroad Commissioner in 2020 triggering a runoff for the Democratic Party nomination with Chrysta Castaneda.

References

External links
Texas House of Representatives - Roberto R. Alonzo official TX House website
Project Vote Smart - Representative Roberto R. Alonzo (TX) profile
Follow the Money - Roberto R. Alonzo
2006 2004 2002 campaign contributions

1956 births
21st-century American politicians
Hispanic and Latino American state legislators in Texas
Living people
Democratic Party members of the Texas House of Representatives
People from Crystal City, Texas
Politicians from Dallas
Texas lawyers
Thurgood Marshall School of Law alumni
University of Texas at Austin alumni